The 2021–22 Notre Dame Fighting Irish women's basketball team represented the University of Notre Dame during the 2021–22 NCAA Division I women's basketball season. The Fighting Irish were led by second year head coach Niele Ivey and played their home games at Purcell Pavilion as members of the Atlantic Coast Conference.

The Fighting Irish finished the season 24–10 overall and 13–5 in ACC play, to finish in a three way tie for third place.  As the third seed in the ACC tournament, they defeated sixth seed Georgia Tech in the Quarterfinals before losing to seventh seed Miami in the Semifinals.  They received and at-large bid to the NCAA tournament and were the fifth seed in the Bridgeport Region.  They defeated twelfth seed  in the First Round and fourth seed Oklahoma in the Second Round before losing to NC State in the Sweet Sixteen to end their season.

Previous season

The Fighting Irish finished the season 10–10 and 8–7 in ACC play to finish in sixth place.  In the ACC tournament, they lost to Clemson in the Second Round.  They were not invited to the NCAA tournament or the WNIT.

Offseason

Departures

Incoming Transfers

2021 recruiting class
Source:

Roster

Schedule and results

Source:

|-
!colspan=6 style=| Exhibition

|-
!colspan=6 style=| Regular season

|-
!colspan=6 style=| ACC Women's Tournament
|-

|-
!colspan=6 style=| NCAA tournament

Rankings
2021–22 NCAA Division I women's basketball rankings

References

Notre Dame Fighting Irish women's basketball seasons
Notre Dame
Notre Dame Fighting Irish
Notre Dame Fighting Irish
Notre Dame